In mathematics, a unicoherent space is a topological space  that is  connected and in which the following property holds:

For example, any closed interval on the real line is unicoherent, but a circle is not.

If a unicoherent space is more strongly hereditarily unicoherent (meaning that every subcontinuum is unicoherent) and arcwise connected, then it is called a dendroid. If in addition it is locally connected then it is called a dendrite. The Phragmen–Brouwer theorem states that, for locally connected spaces, unicoherence is equivalent to a separation property of the closed sets of the space.

References

General topology
Trees (topology)